Pandikasala  is a small town in Malappuram district in the state of Kerala, India. It is a part of Kuttippuram Gramapanchayat.

Temples and Masjid
Mahadeva Temple 
Bilal Masjid

Transportation 
Pandikasala village connects to other parts of India through Kuttippuram town.  National highway No.66 passes through Edappal and the northern stretch connects to Goa and Mumbai. The southern stretch connects to Cochin and Trivandrum.   National Highway No.966 connects to Palakkad and Coimbatore.  The nearest airport is at Kozhikode.  The nearest major railway station is at Kuttippuram.

References 

Kuttippuram area